The 5th Circuit du Lac was a Formula Two motor race held on 26 July 1953 at the Aix-les-Bains Circuit du Lac, France. The race was run over two heats each of 50 laps, with the winner being decided by aggregate time. The winner was Élie Bayol in an O.S.C.A. Tipo 20, finishing second and first in the two heats. Louis Rosier was second in a Ferrari 500 and Lance Macklin third in a HWM-Alta. Gordini driver Jean Behra won the first heat and set fastest overall lap during heat 2, and his teammate Harry Schell set pole position and fastest lap for heat 1, but both retired with mechanical problems.

Classification

Race 

1Heat 1 grid; grid places for heat 2 were determined by the finishing order in heat 1

References

Circuit du Lac
Circuit du Lac
Circuit du Lac